Clive Sindrey (10 August 1903 – 26 June 1981) was an Australian cricketer. He played eight first-class cricket matches for Victoria between 1924 and 1930. He represented Richmond in district cricket from the age of fifteen and baseball from the age of sixteen. He fielded at short stop in baseball and was regarded as a talented covers fielder in cricket, and he credited his skill to baseball fielding.

See also
 List of Victoria first-class cricketers

References

External links
 

1903 births
1981 deaths
Australian cricketers
Victoria cricketers
Cricketers from Melbourne